Timonen is a Finnish surname. Notable people with the surname include:

 Esa Timonen (1925–2015), Finnish politician
 Jussi Timonen (born 1983), Finnish professional ice hockey defenceman
 Kimmo Timonen (born 1975), Finnish professional ice hockey defenceman
 Oiva Timonen (1920–1998), Finnish Olympic wrestler
 Roosa Timonen (born 1997), Finnish tennis player
 Sakari Timonen (born 1957), Finnish blogger

Finnish-language surnames